Genista anglica, the petty whin, needle furze or needle whin, is a shrubby flowering plant  of the family Fabaceae which can be found growing in Cornwall, Wales and eastern Scotland.

References

External links

anglica
Flora of Great Britain
Plants described in 1753
Taxa named by Carl Linnaeus